Félix Ortega Fernández (born February 25, 1972 in Cuenca, Spain) is a Spanish politician and senator. He is the senator representing the Toledo constituency in Spain. He was elected Senator on December 20, 2015 and sworn into office June 26, 2016. Fernández was elected through the Spanish Socialist Workers' Party. On November 10, 2019 he was re-elected for a second term as senator. 

He is the Vice-chairman of the senate committee on Business and Economy in the Senate of Spain.

References 

Spanish politicians
Living people
People from Cuenca, Spain
1972 births
Members of the 13th Senate of Spain
Members of the 14th Senate of Spain